The Vienna Residence Orchestra is a classical orchestra based in Vienna (Austria), founded in 1990 by pianist and conductor Paul Moser and his wife Sylvia Moser.

The orchestra plays works of the First Viennese School in various large orchestrations. The focus is on compositions by Wolfgang Amadeus Mozart and the family of Johann Strauss II as well as works of classical Viennese operetta.

Apart from a daily concert series at Palais Auersperg, there are additional performances, also for individual events.

The Vienna Residence Orchestra is part of the Wiener Residenzorchester Veranstaltungs GmbH.

History
The Vienna Residence Orchestra was founded in 1990 by pianist and conductor Paul Moser and his wife Sylvia Moser. Christian Pollack took over the musical direction of the Vienna Residence Orchestra in 2006. He also invited guest conductors such as Gerhard Lagrange, Daniel Hoyem-Cavazza and Robert Lehrbaumer. In 2017 Christian Pollack resigned and Giuseppe Montesano took over the artistic direction of the Vienna Residence Orchestra.

Tours and guest performances

In the first years after its founding, the orchestra appeared at several international festivals.

Its tours included performances in Paris, Berlin, Rome, Venice, Ravello, Deauville, Athens, the State Opera Budapest, Varese, Mexico, Brussels, Salzburg, and the Vienna Musikverein.

This was followed by concerts in Uruguay (1998), Mexico (1998), Brussels (1999), Thailand (2002), Spain (Canet de Mar, Rialp and Altafulla, 2007) and Italy (Imola, 2007).

Other stations included the "Austrian Weeks" in Stockholm (1997), a performance at the Venice Carnival (2001), the "Italian Fashion & Cultural Event" in Dubai (2003), as well as performances at the Emiglia Romagna Festival (2008), as well as the "Festival de Música de la Vila de Llivia" and the "Festival de Música de la Vila de Rialp" (2012).

The Vienna Residence Orchestra also organized individual concerts for small ensembles, such. As a recital in Altafulla (2015), in which the longtime guest conductor Robert Lehrbaumer with the soloist Rita-Lucia Schneider presented a very atmospheric concert with music by Franz Liszt to Franz Lehar. In 2017, a chamber ensemble of five musicians of the Vienna Residence Orchestra with two ballet dancers followed a concert invitation to the Spanish "Llinars del Vallès" (2017).

With the conductor and pianist Robert Lehrbaumer there is a long-standing partnership-based cooperation, especially in the context of the annual Altenburg Music Academy, and the Halbturner Schlosskonzerte in the monastery Altenburg.

Awards

2009 - Concert Munich Unterföhring: Under the baton of Gerhard Lagrange, the Vienna Residence Orchestra won the "Unterföhringer Mohr" cultural award in 2009.

At the follow-up concert in 2011, the Culture Prize was handed over to the Vienna Residence Orchestra. The Culture Award of the municipality of Unterföhring has a special feature: The "Unterföhringer Mohr" is a pure audience award: The artist or ensemble with the most positive reviews is then at the beginning of the year elected the winner and invited to a new guest performance to Unterföhring. The prize consists of a marble bust after designs by the Ismaninger stone sculptor Margit Festl, as well as a prize money. In 2010, the Culture Prize was awarded for the first time. It went to the Quadro Nuevo group for its performance in Unterföhring in 2008. 2011 was followed by the Vienna Residence Orchestra.

References

External links
 

Austrian orchestras
Musical groups from Vienna
1990 establishments in Austria
Musical groups established in 1990
Organisations based in Vienna